The 2017 WTA Elite Trophy was a women's tennis tournament played at the Hengqin International Tennis Center in Zhuhai, China. It was the 3rd edition of the singles event and doubles competition. The tournament was contested by twelve singles players and six doubles teams.

Tournament

Qualifying
WTA Elite Trophy is an invitation-only event.

Singles qualifying
The field consists of the top eleven players not already qualified for the 2017 WTA Finals, plus either (a) the 12th-player not qualified for 2017 WTA Finals, or (b) a wild card. The final two alternates for the 2017 WTA Finals would have been eligible to play in WTA Elite Trophy even if they had participated in the WTA Finals. Point totals are calculated by combining points obtained from sixteen tournaments. Of these sixteen tournaments, a player's results from the four Grand Slam events, the four Premier Mandatory tournaments, and (for Top 20 players at the end of 2016) the best results from two Premier 5 tournaments must be included.

Doubles qualifying
Two teams composed of players that did not compete in the WTA Finals singles (except Finals Alternates) or doubles competitions, using the players’ combined doubles rankings as of the Monday after the final regular-season Tournament of the current Tour Year to determine the order of acceptance; and up to two teams composed of players that did not compete in the WTA Finals singles (except Finals Alternates) or doubles competitions and that include at least one Elite Trophy Singles Qualified Player or Elite Trophy Alternate, using the higher of the players’ combined singles or doubles rankings as of the Monday after the final regular-season Tournament of the current Tour Year to determine the order of acceptance.
Plus two wild cards. For each wild card not given out, the next highest pair of players shall become a participant.

Format
The singles event features twelve players in a round robin event, split into four groups of three. Over the first four days of competition, each player meets the other two players in her group, with the winner in each group advancing to the semifinal. The winners of each semifinal meet in the championship match. The six doubles teams will be split into two round robin groups, with the winner of each advancing to the final.

Round robin tie-breaking methods

In 2017, the final standings of each group were determined by the first of the following methods that applied:
 Greatest number of wins.
 Greatest number of matches played.
 In case of a 2-way tie:
Head-to-head results
 In case of a 3-way tie:
Percentage of sets won
Percentage of games won

Ambassador of the Tournament
Stefanie Graf, former WTA World No.1 and 22-time Grand Slam champion, continued as Tournament Ambassador for the 2017 WTA Elite Trophy Zhuhai, helping promote the third edition of this elite year-end women’s tennis event.

Prize money and points
The total prize money for the Hengqin Life 2017 WTA Elite Trophy Zhuhai was US $2,280,935.

Undefeated champion: $673,300 ($42,500 participation, $152,600 RR, $478,200 SF/F)

1 RR means prize money or points won in the round robin.

Qualified players

Singles

 Players in gold qualified.
 The player in dark gold was awarded a wildcard.
 Players in brown withdrew from consideration from playing the tournament.

† The player's ranking at the time did not qualify her to play this event. Accordingly, the player's next best result is counted in its place.

‡ The player was not a Top 20 player at the end of 2016 and therefore not required to count her two best Premier 5 results. Accordingly, the player's next best result is counted in its place.

Doubles

 1 Rankings as of 23 October 2017

Other entrants
The following pairs received wildcards into the doubles draw:
  Jiang Xinyu /  Tang Qianhui
  Liang Chen /  Yang Zhaoxuan

Champions

Singles

  Julia Görges def.  CoCo Vandeweghe, 7–5, 6–1.

Doubles

  Duan Yingying /  Han Xinyun def.  Lu Jingjing /  Zhang Shuai, 6–2, 6–1.

See also
 2017 WTA Finals
 2017 ATP World Tour Finals
 2017 Next Generation ATP Finals

References

External links
 Official website 
 Official Page on WTA

2017
WTA Elite Trophy
WTA Elite Trophy
WTA Elite Trophy
WTA Elite Trophy